Dasychira is a genus of tussock moths in the family Erebidae described by Jacob Hübner in 1809. They are well distributed all over Africa, Europe, North America, Madagascar, Japan, China, India, Sri Lanka, Myanmar, Java and Australia.

Description
Palpi porrect (extending forward), and second joint is heavily haired. Antennae with long branches in male and short in female. Legs hairy. Forewings with oblique outer margin. Hindwings with veins 3, 4 and 5 from close to angle of cell. Veins 6 and 7 stalked.

Species

 Dasychira achatina Hering, 1926
 Dasychira acronyctina Schultze, 1934
 Dasychira aeana Collenette, 1931
 Dasychira aenotata Tams, 1930
 Dasychira aeschra (Hampson, 1926)
 Dasychira aethalodes Collenette, 1931
 Dasychira albescens Moore, 1879
 Dasychira albiapex Hering, 1926
 Dasychira albibasalis (Holland, 1893)
 Dasychira albicostata (Holland, 1893)
 Dasychira albilinea (Holland, 1893)
 Dasychira albilunulata (Karsch, 1895)
 Dasychira albinotata (Holland, 1893)
 Dasychira albiplaga Swinhoe, 1908
 Dasychira alboschistacea Rothschild, 1915
 Dasychira albosignata Holland, 1893
 Dasychira albospargata (Holland, 1893)
 Dasychira allotria Hering, 1926
 Dasychira amydropa Collenette, 1960
 Dasychira anaha Swinhoe, 1906
 Dasychira anasses Collenette, 1937
 Dasychira andulo Collenette, 1936
 Dasychira anoista Collenette, 1960
 Dasychira antica (Walker, 1855)
 Dasychira aphanes Collenette, 1938
 Dasychira aphanta Collenette, 1960
 Dasychira apicata (Holland, 1893)
 Dasychira aprepes Collenette, 1956
 Dasychira arctioides (Holland, 1893)
 Dasychira argiloides (Holland, 1893)
 Dasychira aridela Collenette, 1956
 Dasychira astraphaea Collenette, 1931
 Dasychira atrivenosa (Palm, 1873)
 Dasychira azelota Collenette, 1933
 Dasychira basiflava (Packard, [1865]) – yellow-based tussock moth
 Dasychira celaenica Collenette, 1955
 Dasychira cinnamomea (Grote & Robinson, 1866) – cinnamon tussock moth
 Dasychira colini (Mabille, 1893)
 Dasychira dominickaria Ferguson, 1978
 Dasychira dorsipennata (Barnes & McDunnough, 1919) – sharp-lined tussock moth
 Dasychira griseata (Rothschild, 1915)
 Dasychira grisefacta (Dyar, 1911)
 Dasychira groetscheli Bryk, 1934
 Dasychira hadromeres Collenette, 1955
 Dasychira ibele Collenette, 1955
 Dasychira leucophaea (Smith, 1797)
 Dasychira manto (Strecker, 1900) – Manto tussock moth
 Dasychira matheri Ferguson, 1978
 Dasychira meridionalis (Barnes & McDunnough, 1913) – southern tussock moth
 Dasychira mescalera Ferguson, 1978
 Dasychira moerens Felder, 1894
 Dasychira nigrita (Rothschild, 1915)
 Dasychira obliquata (Grote & Robinson, 1866) – streaked tussock moth
 Dasychira pinicola (Dyar, 1911) – pine tussock moth
 Dasychira plagiata (Walker, 1865) – northern pine tussock moth
 Dasychira plagosa Rothschild, 1915
 Dasychira rana Collenette, 1932
 Dasychira sagittiphora Hering, 1926
 Dasychira satelles Collenette, 1939
 Dasychira saussurei Dewitz, 1881
 Dasychira scaea Collenette, 1953
 Dasychira scotina Hering, 1926
 Dasychira scurra Hering, 1926
 Dasychira selene Schultze, 1934
 Dasychira selenitica (Esper, 1783)
 Dasychira semlikiensis Collenette, 1939
 Dasychira solida (Karsch, 1895)
 Dasychira sordida (Möschler, 1887)
 Dasychira soyensis Collenette, 1939
 Dasychira spargata Hering, 1926
 Dasychira sphalera Hering, 1926
 Dasychira sphaleroides Hering, 1926
 Dasychira statheuta Collenette, 1937
 Dasychira stegmanni Grünberg, 1910
 Dasychira striata (Holland, 1893)
 Dasychira strigidentata Bethune-Baker, 1911
 Dasychira stygis Collenette, 1936
 Dasychira styx Bethune-Baker, 1911
 Dasychira tephra Hübner, [1809] – tephra tussock moth
 Dasychira thwaitesi Moore, [1883]
 Dasychira vagans (Barnes & McDunnough, 1913) – variable tussock moth

References

Lymantriinae
Moth genera